Two ships of the British Royal Navy have been named HMS Lewes after the English town.

  was one of 24  paddle wheel minesweeper, built in March 1918 by Fleming & Ferguson Shipbuilders at Paisley near Glasgow.
She was commissioned as HMS Lewes on 23 October 1940. The vessel was scuttled off Australia in 1946.

References
 

Royal Navy ship names